Shree Shyam Mandir, Guwahati is a temple located in Chatribari, one of the main trade hubs in the Indian city of Guwahati. It has His Supremacy, Shri Khatushyamji or Shyam baba as the presiding deity and many sub-temples dedicated to other deities including: Their Most Excellent Lordships, Shri Ganeshji, Biyala's sati dadi or Bajawa ki sati dadi, Shri Balaji Maharaj, Shri Shiva Parivar, Shri Lakshmi Mata, Shri Rani Sati Dadiji, and Shri Santoshi Maa. The temple is visited by hundreds of Shyam Bhakts daily, especially during Aartis and a larger number on Ekadashis and a still larger number on the Shukla paksha Ekadashis of the Kartik, Falgun and Margshirsh months of the Hindu lunar calendar.

Brief history
The work on the gifted land in Chatribari for building the temple started in the later part of 2009. The temple was built by Shri Pandit Gopal Sharma with the help and support of Shyam Bhakts in Guwahati.

Inauguration ceremony
The inauguration ceremony was a seven-day long observance from 8 to 14 April 2016, which included havans, Kalash yatras, and abhisheks. People of all ages and religion were a part of the function. The neighbourhood of Chatribari and its neighbouring areas were spruced up with lamps and decoratives. The entire Guwahati city was in a festive mood during the period of inauguration of the temple.

Other deities

Temple timings
The temple remains open from 6:00 a.m. to 1:00 p.m. and 3:45 pm to 10:00 p.m.

References

Hindu temples in Guwahati